USS Mason (DD-191) was a  in the United States Navy during World War II. She was later transferred to the Royal Navy as HMS Broadwater (H81).

As USS Mason

The first Navy ship named for Secretary of the Navy John Y. Mason (1799–1859), Mason was laid down by Newport News Shipbuilding & Dry Dock Company, Newport News, Virginia on 10 July 1918. The ship was launched 8 March 1919; sponsored by Miss Mary Mason Williams, great-granddaughter of Secretary Mason. Mason was commissioned at Norfolk Navy Yard 28 February 1920,  with Lieutenant Carl F. Holden temporarily in command until 8 March.

On 17 July Mason was designated DD-191. After shakedown off Norfolk, Virginia, she operated along the east coast for the next 2 years until she sailed for Philadelphia. As a result of the Washington Naval Treaty of 6 February 1922 limiting naval armament, the destroyer was decommissioned at the Philadelphia Navy Yard 3 July 1922.

As HMS Broadwater

After World War II broke out in Europe, Mason recommissioned 4 December 1939. Under terms of the Destroyers for Bases Agreement of 2 September 1940, she became one of 50 overage ships of this class turned over to United Kingdom in exchange for 99-year leases on strategic bases in the Western Hemisphere. Mason arrived at Halifax, Nova Scotia, 2 October; decommissioned 8 October 1940; and was transferred to the British Royal Navy as HMS Broadwater with the pennant number H81 the next day.

On 15 October she departed Halifax for the British Isles, via St. John's, Newfoundland, arriving in the River Clyde, Scotland, on the 26th for service with the 11th Escort Group, Western Approaches Command. During the early part of 1941 the Broadwater escorted convoys, carrying troops and military supplies, around the Cape of Good Hope to the Middle East. She spent May and June at Southampton England.

Assigned to the Newfoundland Escort Force in July, the ship patrolled the North Atlantic and guarded convoys against the German submarine "wolfpacks" into the fall of that year. Four officers and forty crew lost their lives including Lt. John Stanley Parker RNVR, the first American to die in action whilst serving under the White Ensign. Broadwaters bell and ship's documents were presented to the people of Broadwater, Nebraska by the British government after the end of World War II. They can be viewed at the Broadwater Public Library and City Museum.

References 
Citations

Bibliography

HMS Broadwater (H81) uboat.net

External links 
       navsource.org: USS Mason
 hazegray.org: USS Mason

 

Clemson-class destroyers
Ships built in Newport News, Virginia
1919 ships
Ships transferred from the United States Navy to the Royal Navy
Town-class destroyers of the Royal Navy
Town-class destroyers converted from Clemson-class destroyers
World War II destroyers of the United Kingdom
Ships sunk by German submarines in World War II
World War II shipwrecks in the Atlantic Ocean
Maritime incidents in October 1941